The "9th" annual (void) Venice International Film Festival was held from 30 August to 14 September 1941. Together with the 1940 and 1942 it is 'considered void- as if they did not happen', as the events were carried out in places far away from the Lido, and very few countries participated due to World War II, with an absolute monopoly of institutions and directors that were members of the fascist Rome-Berlin axis. Additionally, a strong fascist political meddling from the Italian fascist government under Benito Mussolini had led to Italy experiencing a period of cultural depression oppressed by fascist propaganda.

Jury
Giuseppe Volpi di Misurata (Presidente), Italy
Olaf Andersson (Sweden)
László (IV) Balogh (Hungary)
Dahl (Finland)
Derichsweiler (Bohemia)
Jeager (Norway)
Eitel Monaco (Italy)
Naef (Switzerland)
Mihai Puscariu (Romania)
Soriano (Spain)
Jan Van der Hayden (Belgium)
Van der Vegte (Netherlands)
Wilhelm (Danmark)

In Competition

Awards
The following awards were given at the festival:
Coppa della Biennale
Zavaros éjszaka (1940)
Coppa Mussolini per il miglior film straniero
Ohm Krüger (1941)
Coppa Mussolini per il miglior film italiano
La corona di ferro (1941)
Coppa della Biennale
I mariti - Tempesta d'amore (1941)
Coppa della Biennale
Marianela (1940)
Coppa della Biennale
Die mißbrauchten Liebesbriefe (1940)
Coppa Volpi per la migliore interpretazione femminile
Luise Ullrich (Annelie) (1941)
Coppa Volpi per la migliore interpretazione maschile
Ermete Zacconi (Don Buonaparte) (1941)
Medaglia d'oro della Biennale per la migliore regia
Georg Wilhelm Pabst (Komödianten) (1941)
Medaglia d'oro
I Pini di Roma
Targa di segnalazione
Nocturnal Butterfly (1941)
Targa di segnalazione
Bastard (1940)

References

External links

Venice Film Festival 1941 Awards on IMDb

1941 film festivals
1941 in Italy
Venice Film Festival
 
August 1941 events
September 1941 events